The Seven Stars is a Grade II listed public house at Broughton Mills, Cumbria, England.

It is on the Campaign for Real Ale's National Inventory of Historic Pub Interiors.

History

Parts of the building date from 1577 when it was a farmhouse called "Broadstones".

The chef Michael Lane took over the pub in 2004.

Architecture

The roughcast stone whitewashed building has stone flagstone floors and a slate roof. The two-storey structure is of four-bays.

In one of the dining rooms is the original range and fireplace. There are still working gas lights in two of the rooms.

References

Grade II listed pubs in Cumbria
National Inventory Pubs